Byron Harlan may refer to:

Byron B. Harlan (1886–1949), American politician
Byron G. Harlan (1861–1936), American singer